17:28 was a boy band in the Philippines active during the early 2000s (decade). Though known as a boy band, they considered themselves more of a vocal group. The group had four members: Gian Magdangal, Jonard Yanzon, Chino Alfonso and Wackie Valdes. The group was formed when all four members were in their college days, such as that of Gian being from La Salle, Chino being from Ateneo, and Wackie being an alumnus of UP Diliman.

After the band was formed, producer Vic Del Rosario discovered them while they were performing in a live bar gig. Since then, the group adopted the name 17:28 as a reference to verse 17:28 of the Biblical Book of Acts of the Apostles, For in him, we live, move and have our being. And as some of your own poets have said, we are His offspring. They chose the name since all of the members were devout Roman Catholics as they agreed on that decision.

In 2002, though yet without an album, the boys continued performing in various bars and made opening-act guest appearances in concerts of famous Filipino artists. The band specialized in Pop, RnB, and even Gospel music which highlighted their vocal harmony as a group.

Finally in 2003, the band released their self-titled debut album, 17:28 with 18-tracks from Star Music. The album featured tracks such as "Sukob Na" (a 2002 Rainy Station ID of ABS-CBN 2), "Come Breathe Me", and "Natutulog Ba Ang Diyos?", which were mostly used as theme songs for ABS-CBN shows. Later that year, Wackie Valdes left the band citing his priorities in his studies. Thus, only three members remain.

In early 2004, Viva Records released their second album titled Cozy, a 12-track CD composed of pop ballads and RnB tunes. It featured carrier singles including "S.H.B.G.", "Sana Muli", and "Close Your Eyes", which were mostly written by the band members themselves.

Before 2005, the band publicly announced their split. Members of the defunct band have encountered different paths in life soon after: Jonard Yanzon migrated to the U.S., Chino Alfonso and Wackie Valdes became working professionals, while Gian Magdangal is pursuing a comeback to the entertainment business as he joined talent contest Philippine Idol and reached the top 3 grand finals show of the internationally franchised television program, he's recently performed at Hong Kong Disneyland, now recently a TV actor for an action series Ang Probinsyano in 2018 up to 2019.

Self Titled played one more concert in their hometown, before breaking up again and permanently on 2 February 2007.

Discography

References

External links
17:28 Talk Forum
17:28 Picture Gallery
"17:28" Album Info
"Cozy" Album Info

Filipino boy bands
Musical groups disestablished in 2004
Musical groups established in 2001
Filipino contemporary R&B musical groups
2001 establishments in the Philippines
Musical groups from Metro Manila
2007 disestablishments in the Philippines
Musical groups disestablished in 2007